Robert Scarle (fl. 1406) was an English politician.

Very little is known of Scarle. He was related to, and probably the son, of earlier MP for Rutland, Walter Scarle. Thus he was probably related to John Scarle, Lord High Chancellor of England.

He was a Member (MP) of the Parliament of England for Rutland in 1406.

References

14th-century births
15th-century deaths
English MPs 1406